Muenster High School is a 2A  public high school located in Muenster, Texas (USA). It is part of the Muenster Independent School District located in western Cooke County. In 2011, the school was rated "Exemplary" by the Texas Education Agency.

A recent bond election in 2011 provided funds necessary to upgrade high school facilities including a new library, band hall, practice gym and agriculture shop.  The upgrades will replace aging facilities.

Athletics
The Muenster Hornets compete in the following sports:

Baseball
Basketball
Cross Country
Football
Golf
Powerlifting
Softball
Tennis
Track and Field
Baseball

State titles
Basketball - 2019(2A)
Baseball - 2019(2A)
Football - 2019 (2A/DII)

References

External links
Muenster ISD

High schools in Cooke County, Texas
Public high schools in Texas
Public middle schools in Texas